The 2015 Revolution Technologies Pro Tennis Classic was a professional tennis tournament played on outdoor clay courts. It was the tenth edition of the tournament and part of the 2015 ITF Women's Circuit, offering a total of $50,000 in prize money. It took place in Indian Harbour Beach, Florida, United States, on 4–10 May 2015.

Singles main draw entrants

Seeds 

 1 Rankings as of 27 April 2015

Other entrants 
The following players received wildcards into the singles main draw:
  Mercedes Hammond
  Erica Oosterhout
  Rianna Valdes

The following players received entry from the qualifying draw:
  Louisa Chirico2
  Alexa Graham
  Anastasia Evgenyevna Nefedova
  Chiara Scholl
 2 Chirico would have been second seeded, but entered late and had to qualify

Champions

Singles

 Katerina Stewart def.  Louisa Chirico, 6–4, 3–6, 6–3

Doubles

 Maria Sanchez /  Taylor Townsend def.  Angelina Gabueva /  Alexandra Stevenson, 6–0, 6–1

External links 
 2015 Revolution Technologies Pro Tennis Classic at ITFtennis.com
 Official website

2015 ITF Women's Circuit
2015
2015
Revolution